James Madison School, also known as East Scranton Intermediate School and East Scranton Junior High School, is a historic school building located at Scranton, Lackawanna County, Pennsylvania. It was built in 1927–1928, and is a three-story, "C"-shaped steel frame, brick, and reinforced concrete building in an eclectic Late Gothic Revival / Classical Revival style.  It measures approximately 105 feet by 165 feet and has a flat roof.  The building has undergone little alteration since it original construction.

It was added to the National Register of Historic Places in 2009.

In 2015, the building was renovated to house an early childhood learning program as well as apartments for graduate students at the University of Scranton.

References

School buildings on the National Register of Historic Places in Pennsylvania
Neoclassical architecture in Pennsylvania
Gothic Revival architecture in Pennsylvania
School buildings completed in 1928
Buildings and structures in Scranton, Pennsylvania
National Register of Historic Places in Lackawanna County, Pennsylvania
1928 establishments in Pennsylvania